Public transport in Castelldefels (Catalonia, Spain) belongs to the broader Metropolitan Area of Barcelona transportation network, organised around the entity Autoritat del Transport Metropolità (ATM). Castelldefels is both a dormitory town, with many commuters driving everyday into Barcelona, and an important locality in itself.

Railway transport
Trains first arrived in 1881 in Castelldefels with the introduction of the Vilanova line.

Railway stations
Both part of the Rodalies Barcelona commuter railway network.

New railway projects
A Barcelona Metro line which was to be numbered L12 was presented in 2002 as part of a major, much-needed revamp of the transportation facilities in the Baix Llobregat part of the metropolitan area. The line, however, was effectively deemed completely unpractical, and dropped out of the final draft for the area and instead a reform of Rodalies Barcelona, with a new line from Castelldefels to L'Hospitalet de Llobregat or Cornellà.

Accidents
The Castelldefels rail accident occurred on 23 June 2010 when a passenger train struck a group of people who were crossing the railway on the level at Platja de Castelldefels station. Twelve people were killed, and fourteen injured: the majority of the victims were of Latin American origin, particularly from Ecuador.
The accident occurred on St. John's Eve, a major celebration in Catalonia as in other parts of Spain and in several other European countries. The victims were apparently trying to get to the beach less than 200 metres from the station, where a concert by Ecuadorian singer Rubén de Rey had been organized. It was the worst railway accident in Spain since a collision between a passenger train and a freight train at Chinchilla de Monte-Aragón in June 2003 killed 19 and injured 38 people.

Bus lines
All of the local bus lines are operated by Avanza Spain SL.
 CF1 - Castelldefels (Agustina d'Aragó) - Castelldefels (Les Botigues - Pg. Marítim)
 L94 - Barcelona (Estació de Sants) - Castelldefels (Les Botigues - Pg. Marítim)
 L95 - Barcelona (Ronda Universitat) - Castelldefels (Carles Riba)
 L96 - Castelldefels (Bellamar) - Sant Boi de Llobregat (Estació FGC)
 L97 - Barcelona (Pl. Reina Mª Cristina) - Castelldefels (Bellamar)
 L99 - Castelldefels (Passeig Pitort) - Aeroport Terminal T1

Night bus lines
 N14 - Barcelona (Ronda Universitat) - Castelldefels (Centre vila)
 N16 - Barcelona (Ronda Universitat) - Castelldefels (Bellamar)
 N19 - El Prat (Estació Rodalies) - Castelldefels (Passeig Pitort)

See also
 Autoritat del Transport Metropolità
 List of Rodalies Barcelona railway stations
 Transport in Barcelona
 Transport in Badalona
 Transport in Cornellà de Llobregat
 Transport in L'Hospitalet de Llobregat
 Transport in Santa Coloma de Gramenet
 Transport in Sant Adrià de Besòs
 Transport in Montcada i Reixac

References

External links
 City council website